Nazmul is a given name. Notable people with the name include:

Nazmul Huda Bachchu (1938–2017), Bangladeshi film and television actor
Syed Nazmul Haque, (1941–1971), martyred Bengali Journalist
Mohammad Nazmul Hossain (born 1987), Bangladeshi cricketer
Nazmul Huda, Bangladeshi lawyer and politician
Nazmul Huq (1938–1971), first sector commander of the 7th sector in the Bangladesh Liberation War
Nazmul Hussain (born 1948), Indian first-class cricketer who represented Rajasthan
Nazmul Islam (born 1991), Bangladeshi cricketer
A.K. Nazmul Karim (1922–1982), sociologist from Bangladesh
Nazmul Hossain Milon (born 1987), Bangladeshi cricketer
Nazmul Hassan Papon (born 1961), president of Bangladesh Cricket Board, Member of Parliament
Nazmul Hoque Sarkar, Lawyer, politician, martyr
Nazmul Hossain Shanto (born 1998), Bangladeshi cricketer

See also
Nazul